A weighted catenary is a catenary curve, but of a special form. A "regular" catenary has the equation

for a given value of a. A weighted catenary has the equation

and now two constants enter: a and b.

Significance

A catenary arch has a uniform thickness. However, if

 the arch is not of uniform thickness,
 the arch supports more than its own weight,
 or if gravity varies,

it becomes more complex. A weighted catenary is needed.

The aspect ratio of a weighted catenary (or other curve) describes a rectangular frame containing the selected fragment of the curve theoretically continuing to the infinity.

Examples

The Gateway Arch in the American city of St. Louis (Missouri) is the most famous example of a weighted catenary.

Simple suspension bridges use weighted catenaries.

References

External links and references

General links
 One general-interest link

On the Gateway arch
 Mathematics of the Gateway Arch
 On the Gateway Arch
 A weighted catenary graphed

Commons
 Category:Catenary
 Category:Arches

Plane curves
Arches and vaults
Architectural history